The Naples Historic District is a U.S. historic district listed on the National Register of Historic Places in 1987, located in Naples, Florida. The  district is bounded by Ninth Avenue S, 3rd Street, Thirteenth Avenue S, and the Gulf of Mexico. It contains 65 historic houses, two historic commercial buildings, and 26 non-contributing buildings.  The historic development was from 1887 to 1937.

The oldest buildings are "simple, frame vernacular cottages which exhibit small hints of Queen Anne and Stick style influences" such as The Haldeman House, on the beach at Twelfth Avenue South.

The contributing building addresses are:
Broad Avenue South #s: 38, 50, 53, 75, 88, 91, 107, 110, 131, 151, 165, 180, 187, 207, 239, 245 
Tenth Avenue South #s: 32, 112, 132, 144, 149, 163, 215, 255, 263, 264, 273, 290 
Gulf Shore Boulevard #s: 926, 1037, 1111, 1120, 1144
Second Street South #s: 1180, 1188
Third Street South #s: 1148, 1177
Eleventh Avenue South #s: 12, 15, 44, 88, 111, 123, 157, 175, 205, 210, 223, 230, 231, 244, 255, 256, 269, 272, 281, 287
Ninth Avenue South #s: 40, 62
Twelfth Avenue South #s: 50, 71, 95, 111, 137 
Thirteenth Avenue South #s: 40, 55, 76.

References

External links

Naples, Florida
National Register of Historic Places in Collier County, Florida
Historic districts on the National Register of Historic Places in Florida